Diane Neal (born November 17, 1976) is an American actress best known for her role as New York Assistant District Attorney Casey Novak in the television series Law & Order: Special Victims Unit, which she played from 2003 to 2008, and 2011 to 2012. She is also known for portraying Coast Guard Investigative Service Special Agent Abigail Borin in the NCIS franchise.

Early life 

Neal was born in Alexandria, Virginia, the youngest of three daughters to Colleen Neal, a math teacher, and Christopher Neal, a federal attorney. She was raised in Littleton, Douglas County, Colorado, and Ohio.<ref name="auto">{{cite web|title=Law & Order: SVU'''s Diane Neal|url=https://people.com/archive/law-order-svus-diane-neal-vol-62-no-14/|url-status=live|access-date=February 7, 2021|website=People|archive-url=https://web.archive.org/web/20170902045650/http://people.com/archive/law-order-svus-diane-neal-vol-62-no-14/ |archive-date=2017-09-02 }}</ref> After Neal graduated from Littleton's Heritage High School, she moved to Hawaii to attend college, but later left school to become a model and travel. Neal started modeling for Shiseido and Pond's skin-care ads. After deciding to resume her education, Neal began attending Harvard University's Extension School in 2009, and graduated with an associate degree in May 2018.

 Career 
 Acting 
Neal first appeared on Law & Order: Special Victims Unit as a guest star, playing a rapist in the Season 3 episode "Ridicule". Neal first appeared as Assistant District Attorney Casey Novak in the show's fifth season, replacing Stephanie March, who played Alexandra Cabot.

Neal portrayed Novak through the end of Season 9, when the character exited the series after being censured by the New York State Bar. In 2011, Neal reprised her role as Novak in the Season 12 episode "Reparations", when Novak returned to SVU as their temporary ADA. After that appearance, she became a recurring character in Season 13. She was last seen in the episode "Valentine's Day". Neal said of her return to the series in Season 13 to TV Guide, "It's back on track to what the original SVU was intended to be, which is about sex crimes and crimes against children, it's got more of a nitty-gritty feel." She says that March's and her return to the fictional universe of the series provided a familiarity for viewers following original cast member Chris Meloni's departure. "I think they should put us in the court room together!" she says about March.

In 2021 Neal starred as Peggy Sue Thomas in the Lifetime movie Circle of Deception''.

Congressional run 

On February 6, 2018, Neal announced that she would run for the U.S. House of Representatives in New York's 19th congressional district as an independent. She described her political views as "a little libertarian, I'm a lot liberal, mostly progressive, but I have this amazing ability to be able to take really complicated policy and break it down into edible sound bites, which is something most progressive liberals cannot do." Neal finished with 1% of the vote.

Podcast 

On January 14, 2022, Neal announced that she would be the host of a new comedy and talk podcast named "Hear Say with Diane Neal". The podcast is intended to "amuse and enlighten".

Personal life 
In 2005, Neal married Irish model Marcus O. Fitzgerald in a ceremony in the Dominican Republic. Neal and Fitzgerald divorced in 2014.

Neal was later involved in a relationship with magician JB Benn. It ended acrimoniously, and in November 2019 Neal became the plaintiff in a lawsuit in which she made allegations against Benn including fraud and identity theft, and she claimed Benn had subjected her to physical and sexual abuse. Benn denied the allegations and released audio recordings in which Neal can be heard berating Benn and making threats including promising to kill Benn's dog in retaliation for slitting her poodle’s throat. Benn has allegedly stalked Neal for several years and violated the criminal protective order against him.

In 2013, Neal was involved in a car accident which fractured her spine. In announcing her 2018 Congressional candidacy, Neal indicated that the long recuperation from her injuries had caused her to place her acting career on hold.

Filmography

Film

Television

References

External links 

 

1976 births
Living people
21st-century American actresses
American female models
American film actresses
American television actresses
Actresses from Colorado
Actresses from Alexandria, Virginia
People from Littleton, Colorado
American actor-politicians
New York (state) Independents
Harvard Extension School alumni
Candidates in the 2018 United States elections